Steven J. Bigelow (born June 10, 1971) is an American former competition swimmer who represented the United States at the 1988 Summer Olympics in Seoul, South Korea.  As a 17-year-old, he competed in the B Final of the men's 200-meter backstroke, finishing with the tenth-fastest time overall (2:02.95) .

See also
 List of University of Michigan alumni

References

1971 births
Living people
American male backstroke swimmers
Michigan Wolverines men's swimmers
Olympic swimmers of the United States
Sportspeople from Fort Wayne, Indiana
Swimmers at the 1988 Summer Olympics
20th-century American people
21st-century American people